USS Anado (SP-455) was a United States Navy patrol vessel in commission from 1917 to 1919.
 
Anado was built as a private motorboat of the same name in 1917 by the Gas Engine and Power Company and the Charles L. Seabury Company at Morris Heights, the Bronx, New York. On 8 July 1917, the U.S. Navy acquired her under a free lease from her owner, Mr. J. A. Mollenhauer of Brooklyn, New York, for use as a section patrol vessel during World War I. She was commissioned as USS Anado (SP-455) on 17 August 1917.

Assigned to the 3rd Naval District, Anado carried out patrol duties in the New York City and Long Island, New York, area for the remainder of World War I.

Anado was stricken from the Navy List on 26 February 1919 and returned to Mollenhauer the same day.

Notes

References

Department of the Navy Naval History and Heritage Command Online Library of Selected Images: Civilian Ships: Anado (American Motor Boat, 1917). Served as USS Anado (SP-455) in 1917-1919
NavSource Online: Section Patrol Craft Photo Archive: Anado (SP 455)

Patrol vessels of the United States Navy
World War I patrol vessels of the United States
Ships built in Morris Heights, Bronx
1917 ships